İlhan Usmanbaş (born 23 October 1921) is a Turkish contemporary classical composer.

Born in Istanbul, Usmanbaş grew up in Ayvalık. When he was twelve years old, his elder brother gave him a cello, and İlhan began to teach himself to play. After moving back to Istanbul, he studied the cello seriously. His maths teacher, a lover of music, advised Usmanbaş to give up the career that he had planned for himself: "We have enough engineers in Turkey. You should be a composer instead."

After graduating from Galatasaray High School, Usmanbaş went on to study under members of the Turkish Five – Cemal Reşit Rey, Ahmet Adnan Saygun, Hasan Ferit Alnar, Ulvi Cemal Erkin, and Necil Kazım Akses – and David Zirkin, at Ankara State Conservatory.

In 1952, he went to the United States on a UNESCO scholarship, where he came under the influence of American pioneers of new and experimental music. In 1955 he received the Paul Fromm Award. In 1971 he became a State Artist in Turkey. In 1993 he received a gold medal from the Sevda–Cenap And Foundation. In 2000 Boğaziçi University awarded him an honorary doctorate, and in 2004 he was presented with a Lifetime Achievement Award at the 32nd Istanbul International Music Festival. He is professor of music at Istanbul Bilgi University.

Usmanbaş is an experimental composer, one of the second generation of Turkish composers, coming after the Five (and opposed to their ideas). He works with a freedom of form and a concentration on intensity rather than melody, with techniques that include neo-classicism, aleatoric music, twelve tone, serialism, and minimalism.

He has composed nearly 120 works, and has won more foreign awards and citations than any other Turkish composer, including commissions from the Koussevitzky Foundation in the United States, and prizes from the Wieniawski Competition in Poland, the International Composers Tribune in Paris, and the International Competition for Ballet Music in Switzerland.

Usmanbaş is married to opera singer Atıfet Usmanbaş.

Notes

External links
Profile, Naxos Records

1921 births
Living people
Galatasaray High School alumni
Turkish classical composers
Contemporary classical composers
State Artists of Turkey
Musicians from Istanbul
Academic staff of Istanbul Bilgi University
Ankara State Conservatory alumni
Male classical composers
Turkish centenarians
Men centenarians